Eisenberg (German: habitational name from any of several places so named from Middle High German īsen "iron" + berg "mountain, hill") is a German surname. Notable people with the surname include:

Arlene Eisenberg (1934–2001), American author
Arlo Eisenberg (born 1973), American aggressive inline skater
Aron Eisenberg (1969–2019), American actor
Billy Eisenberg (born 1937), American bridge and backgammon player
David Eisenberg (born 1939), American biochemist
Emma Copley Eisenberg, American writer
Filip Eisenberg (1876–1942), Polish physician and bacteriologist
Hallie Eisenberg (born 1992), American actress
Howard Eisenberg (born 1926), American author
Jacob Eisenberg (1897–1965), Israeli artist
Jacob Eisenberg (musician) (1898–1964), American pianist, author and teacher
Jerome M. Eisenberg (1930–2022), American dealer
Jesse Eisenberg (born 1983), American actor
Jewlia Eisenberg, American musician, vocalist, and composer
John Eisenberg, American lawyer and U.S. National Security Council Legal Advisor
José Eisenberg (born 1945), Italian entrepreneur and founder of Eisenberg Paris
Josy Eisenberg (1933–2017), French animator of television and co-scenarist of the movie Rabbi Jacob
Larry Eisenberg (1919–2018), American writer
Leon Eisenberg (1922–2009), American child psychiatrist, social psychiatrist and medical educator
Louis Eisenberg (1876–?), Ukrainian-American chess master
Ludwig Eisenberg, birth name of Lale Sokolov (1916–2006), the tattooist of Auschwitz
Matthias Eisenberg (born 1956), German organist
Michael Eisenberg, Israeli venture capitalist
Moshe Eisenberg, birth name of Moshe Peled (1925–2000), Israeli Brigadier General
Ned Eisenberg (1957–2022), American actor
Ophira Eisenberg (born 1972), Canadian comic, writer, and actress
Pablo Eisenberg (born 1932), American scholar, social justice advocate, and tennis player
Rebecca Eisenberg (born 1968), American entrepreneur
Rebecca S. Eisenberg, American lawyer
Ruth Brewer Eisenberg (1902–1996), American pianist, "Ivory" of inter-racial piano duo, Ebony and Ivory
Sonja Eisenberg (1926–2017), German-American artist
Susan Eisenberg (born 1964), American voice actress
Zef Eisenberg (born 1973), British entrepreneur, ultra-speed motorbike racer, and television presenter

See also
Aizenberg
Eizenberg